Anatoliy Tynynyk (born 11 September 1984) is a Ukrainian football midfielder currently playing for Ukrainian Second League club Kremin.

Club history
Evhen Apryshko began his football career in Olympik Donetsk in Donetsk. He transferred to FC Kremin Kremenchuk during 2009 summer transfer window.

Career statistics

References

External links
  Profile – Official Kremin site
  FC Kremin Kremenchuk Squad on the PFL website
  Profile on the FFU website

1985 births
Living people
FC Kremin Kremenchuk players
FC Zirka Kropyvnytskyi players
Ukrainian footballers
Association football midfielders
Sportspeople from Kropyvnytskyi